The Frazier–Lemke Farm Bankruptcy Act was an Act of Congress passed in the United States in 1934 that restricted the ability of banks to repossess farms.

The U.S. 73rd Congressional Senate bill S. 3580 was signed into law by the 32nd President of the United States Franklin Roosevelt.

Background

Between 1933 and 1936, the US Congress in conjunction with US President Franklin D. Roosevelt, passed several economic programs with the goals of giving work (relief) to the unemployed, reforming business and financial practices, and causing economic recovery during the Great Depression.

Roosevelt was interested in farm issues and believed that general prosperity would not return until farming was prosperous. Many different programs were directed at farmers. The first 100 days of his presidency produced a federal program to raise farm incomes by raising the prices farmers received, which was achieved by reducing total farm output. The Agricultural Adjustment Act created the Agricultural Adjustment Administration (AAA) in May 1933 and reflected the demands of leaders of major farm organizations, especially the Farm Bureau and debates among Roosevelt's farm advisers such as Secretary of Agriculture Henry A. Wallace, Rexford Tugwell, Lewis C. Gray and George Peek.

Amendments to bankruptcy law
The 73rd Congress passed legislation in June 1934 to amend the Bankruptcy Act of 1898.

S. 3580 ,  was enacted on June 28, 1934. H.R. 5884 ,  was enacted on June 7, 1934.

Content
The Frazier–Lemke Farm Bankruptcy Act restricted the ability of banks to repossess farms, amended the previously-voluntary Section 75, and added subsection (s), which delayed foreclosure of a bankrupt farmer's property for five years during which the farmer made rental payments. The farmer could then buy back the property at its currently-appraised value over six years at 1% interest or remain in possession as a paying tenant.

The S. 3580 bill was named for North Dakota Senator Lynn Frazier and North Dakota Representative William Lemke.

Court case
The law was challenged by secured creditors, and by May 1935, the US Supreme Court reviewed the law in Louisville Joint Stock Land Bank v. Radford. The Act was ruled unconstitutional because it deprived secured creditors of their property rights, in violation of the Fifth Amendment.

Modification and renewal
Congress responded by enacting the revised Frazier–Lemke Act and naming it the "Farm Mortgage Moratorium Act" in 1935. The terms were modified to limit the moratorium to a three-year period. The revision also gave secured creditors the opportunity to force a public sale, but the farmer could redeem the sale by paying the same amount.

The law was challenged, but the Supreme Court upheld the law in Wright v. Vinton Branch of Mountain Trust Bank of Roanoke.

After expiring in 1938, the act was renewed four times until 1949, when it expired.

See also
1933 Banking Act
Chapter 12 of the Bankruptcy Code
Dust bowl
Federal Declaration of Taking Act of 1931
Great Depression

References

External links
 Public Law 73-486, 73d Congress, S. 3580, An Act to amend an Act entitled "An Act to establish a uniform system of bankruptcy throughout the United States", approved July 1, 1898, and Acts amendatory thereof and supplementary thereto. Amending section 75, entitled "Agricultural Compositions and Extensions" [Frazier–Lemke Farm Bankruptcy Act of 1934]

New Deal legislation
United States federal agriculture legislation
United States federal banking legislation
Dust Bowl
1934 in American law
United States bankruptcy legislation
Agricultural finance